Rise is the fourth album by Christian rock band Building 429, which was released in 2006 by Word Records. It is also the band's second full-length recording on a major label. Radio singles from this album include "Searching for a Savior", "Fearless", "I Belong to You" and "I Believe".

Track listing

Personnel 
Building 429
 Jason Roy – lead vocals, guitars 
 Jessie Garcia – acoustic piano, guitars, backing vocals  
 Scotty Beshares – bass 
 Michael Anderson – drums

Additional musicians
 Paul Bowden – additional guitars 
 Tom Bukovac – acoustic guitar 
 Ken Lewis – drums, percussion 
 Matt Walker – cello 
 Monisa Angell – viola 
 Kristin Wilkinson – viola 
 David Angell – violin
 David Davidson – violin 
 Michael Mellett – backing vocals 
 Michael Tait – lead and harmony vocals (10)

Production 
 Monroe Jones – producer 
 Otto Price – executive producer 
 Jim Dineen – engineer 
 Chris Yoakum – assistant engineer 
 Shane D. Wilson – mixing 
 Pete Carlson – mix assistant 
 John Baldwin – digital editing 
 Brent Kaye – digital editing 
 Andrew Mendelson – mastering at Georgetown Masters, Nashville, Tennessee
 Cheryl H. McTyne – A&R 
 Jamie Kiner – production coordinator 
 Katherine Petillo – creative direction
 Bethany Newman – design 
 Aaron Rapoport – photography
 David Kaufman – wardrobe stylist 
 Thomas Vasquez – management

References

Building 429 albums
2006 albums